Glycifohia is a genus of honeyeaters endemic to New Caledonia and Vanuatu.

The genus contains two species:

The name Glycifohia was first proposed by the Australian ornithologist Gregory Mathews in 1929.

References

 
Bird genera